"Touch of Grey" is a 1987 single by the Grateful Dead, and is from the album In the Dark. The song is known for its refrain "I will get by / I will survive". It combines dark lyrics in the verses with upbeat pop instrumentation. The music was composed by Jerry Garcia, and the lyrics were written by Robert Hunter. It was also released as a music video, the first one by the Grateful Dead.

First performed as an encore on September 15, 1982, at the Capital Centre in Landover, Maryland, it was finally released on In the Dark in 1987.  The song got into the top 10 on Billboard's Hot 100 chart, peaking at number 9, and reached number 1 on the Mainstream Rock Tracks chart, the only song by the band ever to do so on both charts. It was released as a single with "My Brother Esau" and later "Throwing Stones", and has appeared on a number of albums and collections.

Music video
The music video for "Touch of Grey" gained major airplay on MTV and featured a live performance of the band, first shown to be life-size skeleton marionettes dressed as the band, then as themselves. The skeleton of bassist Phil Lesh catches a rose in its teeth, thrown by a female attendee; later, a dog steals the lower leg of percussionist Mickey Hart, and a stagehand hurries to retrieve and reattach it. Near the end of the video, the camera tilts up into the rafters to reveal that the living band members are themselves marionettes being operated by a pair of skeletal hands.

The video was directed by Gary Gutierrez, who had previously created the animation sequences for The Grateful Dead Movie. It was filmed at Laguna Seca Raceway after one of the band's concerts in May 1987.

The popularity of the single and its video helped introduce the Grateful Dead to a new group of fans, resulting in the band gaining additional mainstream attention.

Video documentary
The Grateful Dead also released a 30-minute documentary called Dead Ringers: The Making of Touch of Grey, about the production of the music video. The documentary was directed by Justin Kreutzmann, the son of drummer Bill Kreutzmann.

Personnel
 Jerry Garcia – lead vocals, lead guitar
 Bob Weir – rhythm guitar, backing vocals
 Phil Lesh – bass guitar
 Brent Mydland – organ, synthesizer, backing vocals
 Bill Kreutzmann – drums and percussion
 Mickey Hart – drums and percussion

Legacy
The song "Harmony Hall" by Vampire Weekend has been compared to "Touch of Grey".

Cover versions
"Touch of Grey" is performed by Mighty Diamonds on Fire on the Mountain: Reggae Celebrates the Grateful Dead, a 1996 album by various artists.
The War On Drugs covered the song on the Day of the Dead compilation.

Chart performance

"Touch of Grey" reached number nine on the Billboard Hot 100 chart and peaked at number one on the Mainstream Rock Tracks chart. "Touch of Grey" is the band's only recording to ever reach the Top 40 on the Hot 100.

Notes

External links

 Touch of Grey Lyrics

1987 singles
Grateful Dead songs
Arista Records singles
Songs written by Jerry Garcia
Songs with lyrics by Robert Hunter (lyricist)